Takamitsu (written: 貴光, 峻光, 高光 or 崇光) is a masculine Japanese given name. Notable people with the name include:

 (c. 939–994), Japanese poet
 (born 1938), Japanese Hebraist
 (born 1970), Japanese footballer
 (born 1989), Japanese footballer

See also
, train station in Uwajima, Ehime Prefecture, Japan

Japanese masculine given names